FIFA World Player Gala was an association football award show presented annually by the sport's governing body, FIFA, throughout 1991-2009.

The first awarding ceremony was held on 8 December 1991 in Zürich, Switzerland. The award show was superseded first by the FIFA Ballon d'Or during 2010-15, and since 2016 by The Best FIFA Football Awards. FIFA consider the three historic versions of its gala show as subversions of the same event, and thus celebrated its 30 years anniversary in 2021. FIFA's historical statistics also list the awards in one overall list, comprising the records of all three gala show versions.

Awards by year

1991 awards
 World Player of the year: Lothar MATTHAEUS (GER)
 FIFA Fair Play Award: Real Federación Española de Fútbol (Spanish FA), JORGINHO (BRA)

1992 awards
 World Player of the year: Marco VAN BASTEN (NED)
 FIFA Fair Play Award: Union Royale Belge des Sociétés de Football Association

1993 awards
 World Player of the year: Roberto BAGGIO (ITA)
 FIFA Fair Play Award: Nandor Hidgekuti, (individual award) (HUM), Football Association of Zambia
 Top Team of the Year Award: Germany
 Best Mover of the Year: Colombia

1994 awards
 World Player of the year: ROMARIO (BRA)
 Top Team of the Year Award: Brazil
 Best Mover of the Year: Croatia

1995 awards
 World Player of the year: George WEAH (LBR)
 FIFA Fair Play Award: Jacques Glassmann (FRA)
 Top Team of the Year Award: Brazil
 Best Mover of the Year: Jamaica

1996 awards
 World Player of the year: RONALDO (BRA)
 FIFA Fair Play Award: George WEAH (LBR)
 Top Team of the Year Award: Brazil
 Best Mover of the Year: South Africa

1997 awards
 World Player of the year: RONALDO (BRA)
 FIFA Fair Play Award: Irish spectators of the World Cup preliminary match versus Belgium, Jozef Zovinec (Slovak amateur player), Julie FOUDY (USA)
 Top Team of the Year Award: Brazil
 Best Mover of the Year: Yugoslavia

1998 awards
 World Player of the year: Zinedine ZIDANE (FRA)
 FIFA Fair Play Award: The national associations of Iran, the USA and Northern Ireland
 Top Team of the Year Award: Brazil
 Best Mover of the Year: Croatia

1999 awards
 World Player of the year: RIVALDO (BRA)
 FIFA Fair Play Award: New Zealand’s football community
 Top Team of the Year Award: Brazil
 Best Mover of the Year: Slovenia

2000 awards
 World Player of the year: Zinedine ZIDANE (FRA)
 FIFA Fair Play Award: Lucas RADEBE (RSA)
 Top Team of the Year Award: Netherlands
 Best Mover of the Year: Nigeria

2001 awards
 World Player of the year: LUIS FIGO (POR)
 Women's World Player of the Year: Mia HAMM (USA)
 FIFA Presidential award: Marvin Lee (TRI)
 Top Team of the Year Award: Honduras
 Best Mover of the Year: Costa Rica

2002 awards
 World Player of the year: RONALDO (BRA)
 Women's World Player of the Year: Mia HAMM (USA)
 FIFA Presidential award: Parminder Nagra (ENG)
 FIFA Fair Play Award: Football communities of Japan and Korea Republic
 Top Team of the Year Award: Brazil
 Best Mover of the Year: Senegal

2003 awards
 World Player of the year: Zinedine ZIDANE (FRA)
 Women's World Player of the Year: Birgit PRINZ (GER)
 FIFA Presidential award: The Iraqi Football Community
 FIFA Fair Play Award: Fans of Glasgow Celtic FC (SCO)
 Top Team of the Year Award: Brazil
 Best Mover of the Year: Bahrain

2004 awards
 World Player of the year: RONALDINHO (BRA)
 Women's World Player of the Year: Birgit PRINZ (GER)
 FIFA Presidential award: Haiti
 FIFA Fair Play Award: Confederaçao Brasileira de Futebol
 Top Team of the Year Award: Brazil
 Best Mover of the Year: China PR
 FIFA Interactive World Player: Thiago Carrico de Azevedo

2005 awards
 World Player of the year: RONALDINHO (BRA)
 Women's World Player of the Year: Birgit PRINZ (GER)
 FIFA Presidential award: FRISK Anders (SWE)
 FIFA Fair Play Award: football community of Iquitos (Peru)
 Top Team of the Year Award: Brazil
 Best Mover of the Year: Ghana
 FIFA Interactive World Player: Chris Bullard

2006 awards
 World Player of the year: Fabio CANNAVARO (ITA)
 Women's World Player of the Year: MARTA (BRA)
 FIFA Presidential award: Giacinto FACCHETTI (ITA)
 FIFA Fair Play Award: Brazil, Spain
 Top Team of the Year Award: Brazil
 Best Mover of the Year: Italy
 FIFA Interactive World Player: Andries Smit

2007 awards
 World Player of the year: KAKA (BRA)
 Women's World Player of the year: MARTA (BRA)
 FIFA Presidential award: PELÉ (Edson Arantes do Nascimento) (BRA)
 FIFA Fair Play Award: FC Barcelona
 Best Mover of the Year: Mozambique
 FIFA Interactive World Player: Alfonso Ramos

2008 awards
 World Player of the year: CRISTIANO RONALDO (POR)
 Women's World Player of the year: MARTA (BRA)
 FIFA Presidential award: Women's Football
 FIFA Fair Play Award: Armenia, Turkey
 FIFA Development Award: Palestine

2009 awards
 World Player of the year: Lionel MESSI (ARG)
 Women's World Player of the year: MARTA (BRA)
 FIFA Presidential award: Her Majesty Queen Rania Al Abdullah of Jordan
 FIFA Fair Play Award: Bobby ROBSON (ENG)
 FIFA Development Award: Chinese Football Association
 FIFA Puskás Award:
 Cristiano Ronaldo for the 1-0 goal scored in the 2008–09 UEFA Champions League match between Manchester United and Porto.
 FIFA/FIFPro World XI:
 Iker Casillas (goalkeeper, Real Madrid)
 Patrice Evra (defender, Manchester United)
 John Terry (defender, Chelsea)
 Nemanja Vidić (defender, Manchester United)
 Dani Alves (defender, Barcelona)
 Andrés Iniesta (midfielder, Barcelona)
 Xavi (midfielder, Barcelona)
 Steven Gerrard (midfielder, Liverpool)
 Cristiano Ronaldo (forward, Manchester United/Real Madrid)
 Fernando Torres (forward, Liverpool)
 Lionel Messi (forward, Barcelona)

Awards by name
Official awards given at the annual FIFA World Player Gala (note most awards were continuously given by FIFA after 2009 - just under a different FIFA Gala name): 
 FIFA World Player of the year (1991-2009)
 FIFA Women's World Player of the Year (2001-2009)
 FIFA Fair Play Award (1991-2009)
 FIFA Presidential Award (2001-2009)
 FIFA Interactive World Player Champion (2004-2009)
 FIFA Puskás Award (2009)
 FIFA FIFPRO Men's World 11 (2009)
 FIFA Development Award (2008-2009)
 Top Team of the Year (1993-2006)
 Best Mover of the Year (1993-2007)

See also
FIFA Ballon d'Or (name of the annual FIFA gala show in 2010-15)
The Best FIFA Football Awards (name of the annual FIFA gala show since 2016)
FIFA World Player of the Year
Ballon d'Or

References

External links
 

FIFA trophies and awards
Awards established in 1991
Association football player of the year awards